HMS Loch Fyne was a  frigate of the British Royal Navy, built by the Burntisland Shipbuilding Company Ltd, Burntisland, Fife, Scotland, and named after Loch Fyne in Scotland. The ship was launched in 1944, and served at the end of World War II. Recommissioned in 1951, she served in the Persian Gulf and was scrapped in 1970.

Service history

World War II
Commissioned in November 1944, after sea trials and modifications Loch Fyne joined the 18th Escort Group on 22 December to support convoys on the UK–Gibraltar route. On 27 February 1945 the ship transferred to "Force 38" in the South-Western Approaches for anti-submarine patrols. On 9 April she transferred to Task Group 122.2, based at Portsmouth, to provide convoy support in the English Channel.

After the German surrender in May 1945, Loch Fyne was transferred to Scapa Flow to serve with the Home Fleet supporting the re-occupation of Norway, escorting captured U-boats from Trondheim to Loch Ryan as part of "Operation Deadlight". After a refit, in September 1945 she sailed for service with the East Indies Escort Force in the Indian Ocean, repatriating former prisoners of war and internees, and was deployed for Air-Sea Rescue duties while based at Trincomalee. The ship returned to Portsmouth in April 1946 and was decommissioned.

Home Fleet, 1951–1952
Loch Fyne remained in reserve, and her pennant number was changed to F429 in 1948. Refitted in 1950, the ship was commissioned for service with the 6th Frigate Flotilla, Home Fleet, in January 1951. She sustained damage due to a premature depth charge explosion during sea trials, and so did not join the flotilla until April, to take part in the search for missing submarine . Exercises and visits occupied her until March 1952, when she was decommissioned for modernisation at Henderson's shipyard in Glasgow, and was then placed in reserve.

Persian Gulf, 1956–1963
Loch Fyne was recommissioned on 14 February 1956 for service in Persian Gulf. In May she sailed from Plymouth, arriving at Bahrain in June. Patrolling in the southern Gulf and off the coast of Oman, in July she assisted the disabled Swedish tanker MV Julius. In October she patrolled the northern Persian Gulf and joined exercises with the Iranian Navy.

In January 1957 she assisted the Norwegian tanker Gilda which had run aground on the Iranian coast. In April she sailed from Aden to the Seychelles, then returned to the UK in June, via Mombasa, Freetown and Gibraltar. After a refit she returned to the Persian Gulf in December, and was deployed as a Guard ship at Shatt al-Arab during the Iranian revolution in July 1958. In December Loch Fyne and the cruiser  were at Aqaba when British troops withdrew from Jordan, and she then returned to Devonport to refit.

Loch Fyne returned to Bahrain in July 1959 for continuing duty in the Persian Gulf as part of the 9th Frigate Squadron, carrying out patrols and exercises. In January 1960 she sailed to Bombay for multi-national exercises in the Indian Ocean ("Exercise Jet"). She then returned to Devonport, arriving on 8 April.

After a refit she returned to the 9th Frigate Squadron at Bahrain on 23 December 1960. In January 1961 she sailed to Karachi for repairs to her sonar dome after anti-submarine exercises revealed it to be defective. She then patrolled the coasts of the Trucial States, Oman, and Aden, and took part in Fleet exercises.

A routine docking at Karachi in June 1961 was cancelled, and ship quickly returned to the Persian Gulf to join Task Force 317 as part of "Operation Vantage" following threats to Kuwait's independence from Iraq. She eventually sailed to Karachi at the end of July before returning to the Gulf for further patrols off Kuwait until the end of August, when an international agreement made Kuwait's security the responsibility of the Arab League. In September she sailed for the East African coast to visit Zanzibar and Mombasa, before returning to the UK on 10 November.

On 19 May 1962 she sailed from Portsmouth, arriving at Bahrain on 18 June for exercises and port visits to Muscat, Abu Dhabi, Abu Musa and Tunb. In November after a routine docking at Karachi she took part in the multi-national CENTO exercise "Midlink V". The 1963 programme included the usual patrols and exercises in the southern Gulf, and visits to Dalma, Bombay, Al-Hallaniyah, Mombasa, and Tanga, before returning home in April, arriving at Devonport to decommission on 6 May 1963.

Loch Fyne was laid up in reserve at Devonport, and in 1964 was placed on the Disposal List. In 1970 she was sold for scrapping.

References

Publications

External links
 Uboat.net article on HMS Loch Fyne
 The Loch Class Frigates Association
 HMS Loch Fyne photograph

 

Loch-class frigates
Frigates of the United Kingdom
World War II frigates of the United Kingdom
Cold War frigates of the United Kingdom
1944 ships